Shree is a 2013 Indian Hindi-language science fiction thriller film starring Hussain Kuwajerwala, directed by Rajesh Bachchani and produced by Vikram M. Shah. The film released in India on 26 April 2013.

Cast
Hussain Kuwajerwala as Shree, An Ordinary Man
Paresh Ganatra as Inspector Ganpath 
Anjali Patil as Sonu (Shree's love interest)
K C Shankar as Tilak
Shivani Tanksale as Sheena
 Rio Kapadiya as Jairaj

Critical reception

The Times of India rated the film 3/5, writing "Songs take the film forward instead of simply adding to its length. Overall, Shree is a well-scripted thriller. Go for it." BollywoodMDB rated the film 3/5, writing that "With a great, unique and new story, Shree has huge potential to become attention-seeker among the audience. Though at a low level as compared to Hollywood Sci-Fi flicks, Shree makes a place for itself in the world of off-beat movies. In a nutshell, the film is definitely worth a watch." Martin D' Souza from Glamsham rated the film 3/5, writing "Nevertheless, if only for the first half, this film is worth a watch."

Box office

The film was made on a budget of ₹1,25,00,000 and was released on 100 screens. The film was a moderate success and Hussain's acting was praised.

References

External links
 

2010s science fiction thriller films
2013 films
2010s Hindi-language films
Indian science fiction thriller films
2013 directorial debut films